Cellulomonas marina is a bacterium from the genus Cellulomonas which has been isolated from deep-sea water from the Indian Ocean.

References

 

Micrococcales
Bacteria described in 2013